Wallace Nick railway station served the town of Kelso, Scottish Borders, Scotland from 1850 to 1851 on the Kelso Line.

History 
This temporary terminus opened on 17 June 1851 by the North British Railway. It was only open for 7 months while  station was prepared, closing on 27 January 1851.

References

External links 
 

Disused railway stations in the Scottish Borders
Former North British Railway stations
Railway stations in Great Britain opened in 1850
Railway stations in Great Britain closed in 1851
1850 establishments in Scotland
1851 disestablishments in Scotland